Club Siero is a Spanish football team based in Pola de Siero, in the autonomous community of Asturias. Founded in 1916, it plays in Tercera División – Group 2, holding home matches at Estadio El Bayu, with a capacity of 5,000 seats.

History
Despite being football present in Siero since 1909, Club Siero was not founded until 16 March 1916 with the name of Siero Foot-Ball Club. With the creation of the Spanish football league system the club started playing in Tercera División at Estadio Luis Miranda.

Siero played three editions Copa del Rey, playing against La Liga teams like CA Osasuna or Sporting de Gijón. The club also qualified several times to the promotion play-offs to Segunda División B, but did not promote until 2000. It only played in the third tier during the 2000–01 season, where it was relegated after finishing in the 17th place of the Group 1.

Since its relegation, it is playing in Tercera División and Regional Preferente.

Season to season

1 season in Segunda División B
51 seasons in Tercera División

Honours
Tercera División: 1984–85, 1996–97
Copa RFEF (Asturias tournament): 1994

References

External links
BDFútbol profile
Futbolme.com profile 

Football clubs in Asturias
Association football clubs established in 1916
Divisiones Regionales de Fútbol clubs
1916 establishments in Spain